In robotics, obstacle avoidance is the task of satisfying some control objective subject to non-intersection or non-collision position constraints. What is critical about obstacle avoidance concept in this area is the growing need of usage of unmanned aerial vehicles in urban areas for especially military applications where it can be very useful in city wars. Normally obstacle avoidance is considered to be distinct from path planning in that one is usually implemented as a reactive control law while the other involves the pre-computation of an obstacle-free path which a controller will then guide a robot along. With recent advanced in the autonomous vehicles sector, a good and dependable obstacle avoidance feature of a driverless platform is also required to have a robust obstacle detection module.  

Reactive obstacle avoidance is a behavior based control strategy in a robot. It is a task similar to the navigation problem and produces a collision free motion.

See also
 D* dynamic pathfinding algorithm 
 Robotics
 Robot control

References

External links 
 Forecast 3D Laser System: a LIDAR based obstacle detection and avoidance sensor. Forecast generates a 3D point cloud or cost map output that can be used for robotic command and control software, terrain mapping, and other applications.

Further reading 
 BECKER, M. ; DANTAS, Carolina Meirelles ; MACEDO, Weber Perdigão, "Obstacle Avoidance Procedure for Mobile Robots". In: Paulo Eigi Miyagi; Oswaldo Horikawa; Emilia Villani. (Org.). ABCM Symposium Series in Mechatronics, Volume 2. 1 ed. São Paulo - SP: ABCM, 2006, v. 2, p. 250-257. 

Control theory
Robot control